Mediator complex subunit 13 is a protein that in humans is encoded by the MED13 gene.

Function 

This gene encodes a component of the mediator complex (also known as TRAP, SMCC, DRIP, or ARC), a transcriptional coactivator complex thought to be required for the expression of almost all genes. The mediator complex is recruited by transcriptional activators or nuclear receptors to induce gene expression, possibly by interacting with RNA polymerase II and promoting the formation of a transcriptional pre-initiation complex. The product of this gene is proposed to form a sub-complex with MED12, cyclin C, and CDK8 that can negatively regulate transactivation by mediator.

References

Further reading